Balša Koprivica (born 1 May 2000) is a Serbian professional basketball player for Partizan Belgrade of the Serbian KLS, the Adriatic League and the EuroLeague. He played college basketball for the Florida State Seminoles. He was considered one of the top ten college recruits in the class of 2019 until he dropped to a four-star recruit during his senior year.

Early life
Koprivica was born in Belgrade, Serbia, FR Yugoslavia to Slaviša Koprivica and Tanja Čavić. Slaviša, who stands 6-foot-9 (2.06 m), is a former Serbian professional basketball player who won the 1992 EuroLeague with Partizan. Koprivica moved to Florida, United States in 2012. In February 2017, Koprivica joined the Basketball Without Borders Global Camp in New Orleans, US.

High school career
Koprivica began playing high school basketball in 2015 with University School of Nova Southeastern University in Fort Lauderdale, Broward County, Florida. He played at the 2015 Battle at The Villages high school tournament. In July 2017, he transferred to Windermere Preparatory School in Lake Butler, Orange County, Florida.

In December 2017, he transferred to Montverde Academy in Montverde, Florida.

Recruiting
On 26 October 2018, he committed to Florida State University.

College career
Koprivica played his freshman and sophomore year with the Florida State Seminoles. As a freshman, he averaged 4.7 points and 2.4 rebounds per game. As a sophomore, he averaged 9.1 points, 5.6 rebounds, and 1.4 blocks per game.

On 13 April 2021, Koprivica declared for the 2021 NBA draft, forgoing his remaining college eligibility.

Professional career

Partizan Belgrade (2021–present)
On August 23, 2021, Koprivica officially signed a three-year deal with his hometown and his father's former club Partizan Belgrade, under head coach Željko Obradović. His father was coached by Obradović, who played for Partizan (1991–1993).

NBA draft rights 
Koprivica was selected with the 57th overall pick by the Charlotte Hornets in the 2021 NBA draft and traded to the Detroit Pistons for Mason Plumlee and JT Thor, the 37th overall pick of the 2021 draft. In August 2021, he joined the Pistons for the NBA Summer League. On August 11, he made his debut in the Summer League in a 111–91 loss to the Houston Rockets in which he posted 2 points and a rebound in 4 minutes.

Koprivica joined the Pistons for the 2022 NBA Summer League.

National team career
Koprivica was a member of the Serbian U-18 national basketball team that won the gold medal at the 2017 FIBA Europe Under-18 Championship. Koprivica and Marko Pecarski played together for the national team and won a gold medal at the 2017 FIBA Europe Under-18 Championship. Thirty years ago, their fathers Slaviša Koprivica and Miroslav Pecarski played together for the national team and won a gold medal at the 1987 FIBA Under-19 World Championship.

Career statistics

College

|-
| style="text-align:left;"| 2019–20
| style="text-align:left;"| Florida State
| 27 || 0 || 10.3 || .699 || – || .658 || 2.4 || .3 || .3 || .3 || 4.7
|-
| style="text-align:left;"| 2020–21
| style="text-align:left;"| Florida State
| 24 || 20 || 19.5 || .599 || 1.000 || .689 || 5.6 || .8 || .3 || 1.4 || 9.1
|- class="sortbottom"
| style="text-align:center;" colspan="2"| Career
| 51 || 20 || 14.6 || .632 || 1.000 || .677 || 3.9 || .5 || .3 || .8 || 6.8

See also
List of NBA drafted players from Serbia
 Charlotte Hornets draft history

References

External links
Florida State Seminoles bio

2000 births
Living people
ABA League players
Basketball players from Belgrade
Centers (basketball)
Charlotte Hornets draft picks
Florida State Seminoles men's basketball players
KK Partizan players
Montverde Academy alumni
Serbian expatriate basketball people in the United States
Serbian men's basketball players
Serbian people of Montenegrin descent